2015 Svenska Cupen in bandy had its playoff in the weekend of 26–27 September 2015 in Lidköping. This was the eleventh annual Svenska Cupen.

Västerås SK won the final 6–2 (1–2) against Edsbyns IF. Sandvikens AIK won the bronze medals after 7–2 against Hammarby IF.

References

2015 in bandy
Bandy competitions in Sweden
September 2015 sports events in Europe
2015 in Swedish sport